The Archdiocese of Blantyre is the metropolitan see for the ecclesiastical province of Blantyre in Malawi.

The cathedral church of the archdiocese is the Our Lady of Wisdom Cathedral, Blantyre.

Out of a total population of 4,600,000, there are 1,133,850 Catholics. There are 78 priests and 287 religious.

Currently,Thomas Luke Msusa SMM is the bishop of the diocese.

http://www.catholic-hierarchy.org/bishop/bmsusa.html

History

 1903.12.03: Established as Apostolic Prefecture of Shiré from Apostolic Vicariate of Nyassa
 1908.04.14: Promoted as Apostolic Vicariate of Shiré
 1952.05.15: Renamed as Apostolic Vicariate of Blantyre
 1959.04.25: Promoted as Metropolitan Archdiocese of Blantyre

Bishops

Ordinaries
Prefect Apostolic of Shiré
Father Auguste Prézeau, S.M.M.:1903.12.03 - 1908.04.18 see below
Vicars apostolic of Shiré
Auguste Prézeau, S.M.M.:see above 1908.04.18 - 1909.12.02
Louis-Joseph-Marie Auneau, S.M.M.:1910.05.09 - 1949.12.25
John Baptist Hubert Theunissen, S.M.M.:1949.12.25 – 1952.05.15 see below
Vicar apostolic of Blantyre (Roman rite)
John Baptist Hubert Theunissen, S.M.M.:see above 1952.05.15 – 1959.04.25 see below
Metropolitan archbishops of Blantyre (Roman rite)
John Baptist Hubert Theunissen, S.M.M.:see above 1959.04.25 – 1967.10.14
James Chiona:1967.11.29 – 2001.01.23
Tarcisius Gervazio Ziyaye:2001.01.23 - 2013.07.03; transferred to be Archbishop of Lilongwe due to a resignation
Thomas Luke Msusa:2013.11.21 -

Auxiliary Bishops
James Chiona (1965-1967), appointed Archbishop here
Montfort Stima (Sitima) (2010-2013), appointed Bishop of Mangochi

Other priest of this diocese who became bishop
Peter Martin Musikuwa, appointed Bishop of Chikwawa in 2003

Suffragan dioceses
Diocese of Chikwawa
Diocese of Mangochi
Diocese of Zomba

See also
List of Roman Catholic dioceses in Malawi

Sources
GCatholic.org

Roman Catholic dioceses in Malawi
Blantyre